Hognut or pignut can mean any of a number of unrelated plants:

 Bunium bulbocastanum (black cumin) or Conopodium majus (kippernut) of the Apiaceae
 rushpeas, particularly Hoffmannseggia glauca (Indian rushpea) and Hoffmannseggia densiflora, of the Fabaceae
 Carya glabra (pignut hickory) of the Juglandaceae
 Hyptis suaveolens (chan) of the Lamiaceae